Hillsdale is a village in Rock Island County, Illinois, United States. The population was 523 at the 2010 census.

Geography
Hillsdale is located at  (41.610304, -90.173573).

Demographics

At the 2000 census, there were 588 people, 219 households and 157 families living in the village. The racial make-up was 95.75% White, 0.51% African American, 0.68% Native American, 1.70% from other races and 1.36% from two or more races. Hispanic or Latino of any race were 2.72%.

Of the 219 households, 35.6% had children under the age of 18 living with them, 52.5% were married couples living together, 14.6% had a female householder with no husband present and 28.3% were non-families. 21.9% of households were one person and 4.1% were one person aged 65 or older. The average household size was 2.68 and the average family size was 3.13.

The age distribution was 28.7% under the age of 18, 8.2% from 18 to 24, 31.8% from 25 to 44, 21.8% from 45 to 64, and 9.5% 65 or older. The median age was 34 years. For every 100 females, there were 89.1 males. For every 100 females age 18 and over, there were 94.0 males.

The median household income was $46,964 and the median family income was $49,519. Males had a median income of $31,250 and females $20,313. The per capita income was $21,772. About 9.2% of families and 11.0% of the population were below the poverty line, including 15.2% of those under age 18 and none of those age 65 or over.

References

Villages in Rock Island County, Illinois
Villages in Illinois
Cities in the Quad Cities